Darvall is the name of

 Chum Darvall (born 1957), Australian middle-distance runner and sprinter
 Denise Darvall (1942 – 1967), donor in the world’s first successful human heart transplant
 Frank Ongley Darvall (1906 – 1987), British politician and diplomat 
 Peter Darvall, Vice-Chancellor and President of Monash University

See also
Darvell (surname)